Alpha Delphini (α Delphini, abbreviated Alpha Del, α Del) is a multiple star system in the constellation of Delphinus.

It consists of a triple star, designated Alpha Delphini A, together with five faint, probably optical companions, designated Alpha Delphini B, C, D, E and F. A's two components are themselves designated Alpha Delphini Aa (officially named Sualocin , the historical name for the entire system) and Ab.

Nomenclature
α Delphini (Latinised to Alpha Delphini) is the system's Bayer designation. The designations of the six constituents as Alpha Delphini A to F, and those of A's components - Alpha Delphini Aa and Ab - derive from the convention used by the Washington Multiplicity Catalog (WMC) for multiple star systems, and adopted by the International Astronomical Union (IAU).  The primary star's components Aa, Ab1, and Ab2 are also sometimes referred to as A, Ba, and Bb respectively, given that the outer pair have been resolved.

The system bore an historical name, Sualocin, which arose as follows: Niccolò Cacciatore was the assistant to Giuseppe Piazzi, and later his successor as Director of the Palermo Observatory. The name first appeared in Piazzi's Palermo Star Catalogue. When the Catalogue was published in 1814, the unfamiliar names Sualocin and Rotanev were attached to Alpha and Beta Delphini, respectively. Eventually the Reverend Thomas Webb, a British astronomer, puzzled out the explanation. Cacciatore's name, Nicholas Hunter in English translation, would be Latinized to Nicolaus Venator. Reversing the letters of this construction produces the two star names. They have endured, the result of Cacciatore's little practical joke of naming the two stars after himself.

In 2016, the International Astronomical Union organized a Working Group on Star Names (WGSN) to catalogue and standardize proper names for stars. The WGSN decided to attribute proper names to individual stars rather than entire multiple systems. It approved the name Sualocin for the component Alpha Delphini Aa on 12 September 2016 and it is now so included in the List of IAU-approved Star Names.

In Hindu astronomy, the star corresponded to one of the nakshatras named Dhanishta.

Properties 
Alpha Delphini A is a spectroscopic binary star which has now been resolved using speckle interferometry. Alpha Delphini Aa has a spectral type of B9IV. it is a subgiant that has begun to evolve away from the main sequence, is about 3.8 times as massive as the sun and about twice as hot.

The spectral type of the secondary star cannot be determined as it is too close and too faint compared to the primary, but it has been shown to itself be a binary star with an orbit of 30 days.  Spectral lines showing 30-day radial velocity changes are likely to belong to the faintest component, expected from its mass to be an F-type star.  Then the more massive star of the inner pair is likely to be an A-type dwarf, possibly not detected in the spectral because rapid rotation blurs its absorption lines.

The five faint companions have visual magnitudes around 11th to 13th magnitude and separations of 35" to 72". They all show motion relative to Alpha Delphini A, and have much smaller parallaxes.

References

Delphini, Alpha
Delphini, 09
Delphinus (constellation)
Binary stars
7
B-type subgiants
Sualocin
101958
7906
BD+15 4222
196867